Oh Carol is a 1974 compilation album by pop rock singer-songwriter Neil Sedaka. It was released in Great Britain and throughout Western Europe on the RCA Camden label on both LP and cassette tape. The album features some of his better-known hits from the 1950s and 1960s along with some selections from a concert he gave in Sydney, Australia.

Track listing

Side 1
 Oh! Carol (1959)
 Calendar Girl (1961)
 The Father of Girls (c. 1974?)
 Breaking Up Is Hard To Do (1962)
 Proud Mary (c. 1974?)
 Little Devil (1961)

Side 2
< Happy Birthday Sweet Sixteen (1961)
 Star-Crossed Lovers (c. 1974?)
 My World Keeps Getting Smaller Every Day (c. 1974?)
 Stairway to Heaven (1960)
 King of Clowns (1962)
 Everything is Beautiful (c. 1974?)

1974 compilation albums
Neil Sedaka compilation albums